Events from the year 1821 in the United States.

Incumbents

Federal Government 
 President: James Monroe (DR-Virginia)
 Vice President: Daniel D. Tompkins (DR-New York)
 Chief Justice: John Marshall (Virginia)
 Speaker of the House of Representatives: John W. Taylor (DR-New York) (until March 4), Philip P. Barbour (DR-Virginia) (starting December 4)
 Congress: 16th (until March 4), 17th (starting March 4)

Events
 February 9 – The George Washington University is chartered as The Columbian College of the District of Columbia by President James Monroe.
 March 4 – James Monroe and Daniel D. Tompkins begin their second terms as President and Vice President of the United States.
 March 5 – James Monroe is sworn in for his second term as President of the United States. Daniel D. Tompkins is sworn in for his second term as Vice President of the United States.
 June 27 – The New Hampton School is founded in the state of New Hampshire.
 July 10 – The U.S. takes possession of its newly bought territory of Florida from Spain.
 August 4 – The Saturday Evening Post relaunched.
 August 10 – Missouri is admitted as the 24th U.S. state (see History of Missouri).
 September 3 – The 1821 Norfolk and Long Island hurricane strikes New York City.
 September 18 – Amherst College is founded in Massachusetts.
 November 16 – American Old West: The Santa Fe Trail is used for the first time by a White American, William Becknell.
 History of Liberia – The first groups of freed slaves from the U.S. arrive in modern-day Liberia and found Monrovia.
 Widener University is founded in Wilmington, Delaware, as The Bullock School for Boys.

Ongoing
 Era of Good Feelings (1817–1825)

Births
 January 2 – Napoleon LeBrun, architect (died 1901)
 January 8 – James Longstreet, one of the foremost Confederate generals of the American Civil War (died 1904)
 January 16 – John C. Breckinridge, 14th Vice President of the United States from 1857 to 1861, U.S. Senator from Kentucky in 1861 (died 1875)
 February 4 – Frederick Goddard Tuckerman, sonneteer (died 1873)
 February 19 – Francis Preston Blair Jr., U.S. Senator from Missouri from 1871 to 1873 (died 1875)
 March 20 – Ned Buntline (Edward Zane Carroll Judson Sr.), publisher, dime novelist and publicist (died 1886)
 April 12
 Samuel G. Arnold, U.S. Senator from Rhode Island from 1862 to 1863 (died 1880)
 Adonijah Welch, U.S. Senator from Florida from 1868 to 1869. (died 1889)
 April 15 – Joseph E. Brown, U.S. Senator from Georgia from 1880 to 1891 (died 1894)
 July 6 – Edmund Pettus, U.S. Senator from Alabama from 1897 to 1907 (died 1907)
 July 8 – Maria White Lowell, poet and abolitionist (died 1853)
 July 13 – Nathan Bedford Forrest, Confederate Civil War General, first Grand Wizard of the Ku Klux Klan (died 1877)
 September 22 – John Conness, Irish-born U.S. Senator from California from 1863 to 1869 (died 1909)
 October 7 – Richard H. Anderson, United States Army officer during the Mexican–American War, Confederate general during the American Civil War (died 1879)
 October 10 – Wade Keyes, Acting Confederate States Attorney General in 1861 and 1863–1864 (died 1879)
 October 22 – Collis P. Huntington, railroad promoter (died 1900)
December 25 – Clara Barton, humanitarian and founder of the American branch of the Red Cross.

Deaths
 January 4 – Elizabeth Ann Seton, saint (born 1774)
 March 13 – Waightstill Avery, lawyer and soldier, fought a duel with Andrew Jackson (born 1741)
 October 11 – John Ross Key, commissioned officer in the Continental Army, judge, lawyer and father of Francis Scott Key (born 1754)
 October 24 – Elias Boudinot, President of the Continental Congress (born 1740)
 Full Date Unknown – Lucy Terry first known African American poet (born c. 1730 in Africa)

See also
Timeline of United States history (1820–1859)

References

External links
 

 
1820s in the United States
United States
United States
Years of the 19th century in the United States